Llanfair-y-Cwmwd (or Llanfair-yn-y-Cwmwd) is a village in the  community of Rhosyr, Ynys Môn, Wales, which is 126.5 miles (203.5 km) from Cardiff and 211.4 miles (340.2 km) from London.

References

See also
List of localities in Wales by population

Villages in Anglesey